Bandadka  is a small town in Kasaragod district in the state of Kerala, India.
It is also called as Kottakal because of Bandadka Fort. It comes under Kuttikole Grama Panchayat. Bandadka Pin code is 671541 and postal head office is Chengala.

Demographics
As of 2011 Census, Bandadka had a population of 7,824 with 3,893 males and 3,931 females. The average female sex ratio was 1010 lower than the state average of 1084. 10.1% of the population in the village was under 6 years of age. Bandadka had an average literacy of 87.36% lower than the state average of 94%; male literacy was 91% and female literacy was 83.66%.

Transportation
Bandadka is Situated between Poinachi - Aletty- Sullia road. Mysore and Bangalore can easily 
get by these road. Private and ksrtc Buses provide routes to Kasaragod, Kanhangad, Panathur, Mangalore and Kannur.
The Nearest Railway station is Kasaragod and Kanhangad on Mangalore-Palakkad line.
There are Airports at Mangalore International Airport in North and Kannur International Airport in South.

References

Suburbs of Kasaragod
Bandadka Village Area